The 2013–14 Liga II was the 74th season of the Liga II, the second tier of the Romanian football league system.  The season began on 7 September.

The 25 teams were divided in two series (with 13, respectively 12 teams). The regular season was played in a round-robin tournament. The first six teams from each series played a play-off for promotion to Liga I. The teams placed 6th to 12th played in a Relegation play-out. 
The first two teams in each series promoted at the end of the season to Liga I, and the teams placed below the 10th place were relegated to Liga III.

Teams
At the end of 2012–13 season, Botoșani, Săgeata Năvodari from Seria I and Corona Brașov, ACS Poli Timișoara promoted to Liga I. Four teams were relegated to Liga III: Chindia Târgoviște, Dinamo II (Seria I), FCMU Baia Mare and Unirea Alba Iulia.

The winners of the six 2012–13 Liga III series were promoted to Liga II: SC Bacău, Gloria Buzău, ACS Berceni, Minerul Motru, Olimpia Satu Mare and Unirea Tărlungeni.

After the end of the last season, FC Delta Tulcea, CS Otopeni and FC Argeș were dissolved. Luceafărul Oradea withdrew from Liga II and enrolled to Liga IV.

Craiova teams

Following a legal decision, FC U Craiova was re-enrolled by the Romanian Football Federation to the second series of Liga II. A second place was offered to Universitatea Craiova, the team supported by the local authorities.

Renamed teams

CS Buftea was moved to Clinceni and renamed FC Clinceni, while Damila Măciuca was moved to Reșita, becoming Metalul Reșița. FCM Târgu Mureș was renamed ASA Târgu Mureș.

Excluded teams
Sportul Studențesc was excluded for the championship because the team was not programmed in the first four rounds due to a debt to Rapid CFR Suceava.

Stadia by capacity and locations

Seria I

Seria II

League tables

Seria I

Seria II

Promotion play-offs
At the end of the regular season, the first six teams from each series will play a Promotion play-off and the winners and runners-up will promote to the Liga I. The teams will start the play-off with the number of points gained in the regular season only against the other qualified teams.

Seria I

Seria II

Relegation play-outs
At the end of the regular season, the teams that finish 7-12 form each series will play a Relegation play-out and the last three teams will relegate to the Liga III. The teams will start the play-out with the number of points gained in the regular season only against the other qualified teams.

Seria I

Seria II

Goals 
5 goals
 Daniel Bălan (Rapid CFR Suceava)

3 goals
 Cristian Silvăşan (Farul Constanța)

See also

 2013–14 Liga I
 2013–14 Liga III

References

2013-14
Rom
2